Blewett Pass, at an elevation of , is a mountain pass in the Wenatchee Mountains (an eastward extension of the Cascades) of Washington state that is crossed by U.S. Route 97 (US 97). Named for Edward Blewett, a Seattle mining promoter of the 1880s, it lies on the route of the historical Yellowstone Trail.

Unlike the many well known passes that lie on the spine of the Cascades, Blewett Pass lies on the divide between the Wenatchee River to the north and the Yakima River to the south. The highway over the pass connects Interstate 90 (I-90) between Seattle and Ellensburg, Washington with US 2 between Monroe and Wenatchee. The route from Seattle to Wenatchee over Snoqualmie Pass and Blewett Pass is a reasonable alternative to the more northerly route over Stevens Pass.

What is now called Blewett Pass was formerly known as Swauk Pass. Swauk was renamed to Blewett Pass in the 1960s after the completion of a new highway alignment for US 97, with locals preferring to keep the old name. The old pass road is Forest Road 9715 and Forest Road 7320. The road closes for the winter so that seasonal recreation may take place. One should inquire about conditions with a Wenatchee National Forest office before driving the road upon re-opening in the warmer months.

References

External links

Blewett Pass road conditions
International Road Trip Enthusiasts Association: Old Blewett Pass
Toure de Old Blewett Road

Mountain passes of Chelan County, Washington
Landforms of Kittitas County, Washington
Mountain passes of Washington (state)
Mountain passes of the Cascades
Transportation in Chelan County, Washington
Transportation in Kittitas County, Washington
U.S. Route 97